A Maze of Recycled Creeds is the fifth studio album by French technical death metal band Gorod. It was released on 16 October 2015 via Listenable Records in Europe, and Unique Leader Records in the United States. It's the band's first album to feature drummer Karol Diers.

Track listing

Personnel 
Gorod
 Julien "Nutz" Deyres – vocals
 Mathieu Pascal - guitars
 Nicolas Alberny - guitars
 Benoit Claus - bass
 Karol Diers - drums

Additional musicians
 Denis Cornardeau - guitar solo 

Production and design
 Mathieu Pascal - production, recording, mixing, layout
 Pierre-Yves Marani – mastering
 Eric Liberge - artwork

References 

2015 albums
Listenable Records albums
Unique Leader Records albums
Gorod (band) albums